Jon Magunazelaia Argoitia (born 13 July 2001) is a Spanish professional footballer who plays as an attacking midfielder for Real Sociedad C.

Club career
Born in Eibar, Gipuzkoa, Basque Country, Magunazelaia joined Real Sociedad's youth setup in 2016 from SD Eibar, after being linked to Athletic Bilbao. He made his senior debut with the C-team on 18 October 2020, coming on as a second-half substitute in a 1–2 Tercera División away loss against Gernika Club.

Magunazelaia scored his first senior goals on 8 December 2020, netting a hat-trick for the C's in a 5–2 home success over JD Somorrostro. During the 2020–21 campaign, he scored five goals in 24 appearances as the C-side achieved promotion to Segunda División RFEF.

Magunazelaia made his professional debut with the reserves on 18 September 2021, starting and scoring the opener in a 1–1 away loss against Real Zaragoza in the Segunda División.

References

External links

2001 births
Living people
Footballers from Eibar
Spanish footballers
Association football midfielders
Segunda División players
Segunda Federación players
Tercera División players
Real Sociedad C footballers
Real Sociedad B footballers